The Penchvalley Express is the daily fast passenger train which runs between Indore Junction BG railway station of Indore City and Chhindwara Junction railway station of Chhindwara. Both the cities are located in the state of Madhya Pradesh was introduced on 2006. It ran combined with 18237 / 18238 Chhattisgarh Express between  &  until 2020. Now it is made into separate train & categorized as Express Type.

Number and nomenclature

The old/new number provided for the train is :

0285/59385- Indore to Chhindwara
0286/59386 - Chhindwara to Indore

The name Panch Valley signifies the Pench Valley, where the city of Chhindwara is situated.

References
 

Slow and fast passenger trains in India
Rail transport in Madhya Pradesh
Transport in Indore
Chhindwara
Railway services introduced in 1991